Marcus Corowa is an Indigenous Australian singer/songwriter from Bowen, Queensland. Now based in Sydney, Corowa performs a mix of blues, soul and jazz

Corowa won a Deadly in 2012 for Most Promising New Talent in Music.

On 15 September, 2019 Marcus joined the cast of puppetry show Song for the Mardoowarra during its season at the World Festival of Puppet Theatres in Charleville Mezieres, France.

Discography
 The Greater You

References

External links
 Marcus Corowa

Indigenous Australian musicians
Australian male singers
Living people
Year of birth missing (living people)